is a retired Japanese table tennis player and coach who won four world titles between 1961 and 1967. He is left-handed.

Table tennis career
He won nine World Championship medals included four gold medals; one in the doubles with Nobuya Hoshino; two in the mixed doubles with Kazuko Ito-Yamaizumi and Masako Seki respectively and one in the team event for Japan.

Retirement
After retiring from competitions Kimura worked as a sports functionary. He is a senior member of the Japanese Olympic Committee and vice president of the Japanese Table Tennis Association.
 In 2014 he was elected to the Advisory Council of the International Table Tennis Federation.

References

Japanese male table tennis players
Japanese table tennis coaches
1940 births
Living people
Asian Games medalists in table tennis
Table tennis players at the 1962 Asian Games
Table tennis players at the 1966 Asian Games
Asian Games gold medalists for Japan
Asian Games silver medalists for Japan
Asian Games bronze medalists for Japan
Medalists at the 1962 Asian Games
Medalists at the 1966 Asian Games